Macraspis is a genus of beetles of the family Scarabaeidae.

Selected species
 Macraspis chloraspis (Laporte de Castelnau, 1840) 
 Macraspis cincta (Drury, 1782)
 Macraspis clavata (Olivier, 1789)
 Macraspis elegans (Olsson, 1869) 
 Macraspis faurei (Soula) 
Macraspis festiva Burmeister, 1844
 Macraspis lateralis (Olivier, 1789) 
 Macraspis lucida (Olivier, 1789.)
 Macraspis morio (Burmeister) 
 Macraspis oblonga (Burmeister, 1844) 
 Macraspis olivieri (Waterhouse, 1881) 
 Macraspis pseudochrysis (Landin, 1956) 
 Macraspis xanthosticta (Burmeister, 1844)
 Macraspis bivitrata (M'Leay, 1819)
 Macraspis festiva (Burmeister, 1844)

References

Scarabaeidae